Anders Henrik Henrikson (13 June 1896 – 17 October 1965) was a Swedish actor and film director. He appeared in more than 50 films between 1913 and 1965. He also directed 30 films between 1933 and 1956.

Selected filmography

Actor

 The Lady of the Camellias (1925)
 The Strongest (1929)
 Man's Way with Women (1934)
 Walpurgis Night (1935)
 Intermezzo (1936)
 It Pays to Advertise (1936)
  Russian Flu (1937)
 Conflict (1937)
 Oh, Such a Night! (1937)
 John Ericsson, Victor of Hampton Roads (1937)
 Art for Art's Sake (1938)
 A Woman's Face (1938)
 Styrman Karlssons flammor (1938)
 The Great Love (1938)
 Just a Bugler (1938)
 Thunder and Lightning (1938)
 Her Little Majesty (1939)
 They Staked Their Lives (1940)
 A Crime (1940)
 Life Goes On (1941)
Home from Babylon (1941)
 Only a Woman (1941)
 Dangerous Ways (1942)
 The Heavenly Play (1942)
 The Case of Ingegerd Bremssen (1942)
 Dangerous Ways (1942)
 Mister Collins' Adventure (1943)
 I Killed (1943)
 I Am Fire and Air (1944)
 Blood and Fire (1945)
 Tired Theodore (1945)
 The Loveliest Thing on Earth (1947)
The Key and the Ring (1947)
 Prison (1949)
 Miss Julie (1951)
 Defiance (1952)
 Love (1952)
 Resan till dej (1953)
 The Road to Klockrike (1953)
 Barabbas (1953)
 Sir Arne's Treasure (1954)
 Getting Married (1955)
 The Girl in Tails (1956)
 The Minister of Uddarbo (1957)
 Morianna (1965)

Director

 He, She and the Money (1936)
 It Pays to Advertise (1936)
 65, 66 and I (1936)
 Unfriendly Relations (1936)
 Oh, Such a Night! (1937)
 Thunder and Lightning (1938)
 Just a Bugler (1938)
 The Great Love (1938)
 Whalers (1939)
 A Crime (1940)
 The Bjorck Family (1940)
 Life Goes On (1941)
 Only a Woman (1941)
 The Case of Ingegerd Bremssen (1942)
 I Am Fire and Air (1944)
 Mister Collins' Adventure (1943)
 Blood and Fire (1945)
 Tired Theodore (1945)
The Key and the Ring (1947)
 The Loveliest Thing on Earth (1947)
 Girl from the Mountain Village (1948)
 Getting Married (1955)
 A Doll's House (1956)

References

External links

1896 births
1965 deaths
Swedish male stage actors
Swedish male film actors
Swedish male silent film actors
20th-century Swedish male actors
Swedish film directors
Male actors from Stockholm
Eugene O'Neill Award winners